Richard Bradley may refer to:
Richard Bradley (archaeologist) (born 1946), British archaeologist
Richard Bradley (botanist) (1688–1732), English botanist
Richard Bradley (film producer) (born 1949), Australian film producer and publicist
Rich Bradley (born 1955), American politician
Richard Bradley (writer) (born 1964), American writer
Richard H. Bradley, American developer
Richard Bradley (racing driver) (born 1991), British racing driver
R. H. Bradley (1873–?), Canadian-born American politician
Richard Bradley (philosopher) (born 1964), South African philosopher